Mill Pond, also known as Toliver Pond, is a historic natural pond located at Grandin, Carter County, Missouri.  It is approximately 180 meters east of Grandin city limits at 3rd Street. The pond covers about 3 1/2 acres, is spring fed, and is about 60 feet deep.

It was listed on the National Register of Historic Places in 1980.

References

Buildings and structures on the National Register of Historic Places in Missouri
Buildings and structures in Carter County, Missouri
National Register of Historic Places in Carter County, Missouri